Kecamatan Trenggalek is a district (kecamatan) in East Java, Indonesia. It serves as the government and economic centre of Trenggalek Regency.

Climate
Trenggalek has a tropical monsoon climate (Am) with moderate to little rainfall from June to October and heavy rainfall from November to May.

See also

 Districts of Indonesia

References

Districts of East Java